Paper Marriage (Chinese: 過埠新娘) is a 1988 Hong Kong action comedy-drama film directed by Alfred Cheung and starring Sammo Hung and  Maggie Cheung.

Plot

Set in the United States, a down-on-his-luck Chinese boxer named Bo Chin (Sammo Hung) accepts promise of payment to marry a Hong Kong woman named Jade Lee (Maggie Cheung) so she can get American citizenship. They realize too late that they have been set up in a complicated plan to cheat them out of the woman's money. Their adventures begin when Bo is forced back into the ring and Jade tries her hand at mud wrestling.

Production
Although Paper Marriage is set in Los Angeles, California, the film was shot in Edmonton, Alberta. The opening sequence was shot at Northlands Park, while the final action sequence being shot at the West Edmonton Mall.

Cast
 Sammo Hung as Bo Chin
 Maggie Cheung as Jade Lee
 Joyce Godenzi as Bo's ex-wife
 Alfred Cheung as Peter
 Meg Lam as Home Immigration Control officer
 Billy Chow as Thai Boxer (doubled by Chin Ka-lok)
 Dick Wei as White Suit kicker
 Philip Ko as Crazy Eyes
 Chin Ka-lok as White Suit's Thug
 Tony Morelli as White Suit's thug
 Rainbow Ching as Immigration Officer Chin
 Hsiao Hou as White Suit's thug in clown disguise
 Lee Chi-kit as Debt Collector
 Rocky Li

References

External links
 
 
 Paper Marriage at Hong Kong Cinemagic
 Best Edmonton Mall's review on Paper Marriage

1988 films
1980s action comedy-drama films
1988 martial arts films
Hong Kong action comedy-drama films
Hong Kong martial arts comedy films
Underground fighting films
Martial arts tournament films
1980s Cantonese-language films
Golden Harvest films
Films about immigration
Films set in Los Angeles
Films shot in Edmonton
1988 comedy films
1988 drama films
1980s Hong Kong films